Haim–Munk syndrome (also known as "palmoplantar keratoderma with periodontitis and arachnodactyly and acro-osteolysis") is a skin disease caused, like Papillon-Lefevre Syndrome, by a mutation in the cathepsin C gene. One of its features is thick curved finger and toenails.

It is named after Salim Haim and J. Munk, who first described the disease in 1965.

Symptoms 
Most of the signs of Haim–Munk syndrome begin to manifest during the first 2–4 years of life. Commons signs at this stage are thickening and scaling of the skin of the palms, soles (palmoplantar keratoderma) and elbows, and shedding of the primary dentition caused by recurrent episodes of dental caries and periodontitis. People also demonstrate thickening and curving of nails (onychogryphosis), flat foot, extreme length and slenderness of fingers and toes (arachnodactyly), and osteolysis involving the distal phalanges of fingers and toes (acro-osteolysis). Permanent flexion contractures of the large and small joints may occur as the disease progresses.

Causes 
Haim–Munk syndrome is an inherited autosomal recessive trait. In some instances, the parents of individuals with Haim–Munk syndrome are consanguineously related. Genetic analysis suggests that Haim–Munk syndrome may be due to the genetic mutation of gene CTSC cathepsin C, which is located on the long arm of chromosome 11. Furthermore, analysis demonstrates that in individuals with Haim–Munk syndrome, a haplotype surrounded the gene location and appeared to be transmitted with it as unit. This suggests that the CTSC gene was inherited from a common ancestor.

The CTSC cathepsin C gene regulates the production of the enzyme cathepsin C, which is expressed in various organs and tissues. The CTSC gene is thought to play a role in the differentiation of epithelial cells, resulting in the hyperkeratosis and erythema of the soles of feet and palms of hands, and connects the gingiva to the tooth surface.

Diagnosis 
Diagnosis comes from the taking of a comprehensive patient history and identification of characteristic symptoms. Identification of the physical symptoms is important to distinguish this disease from Papillon-Lefevre Syndrome.

In many cases diagnosis of Haim–Munk syndrome may be difficult in small children, as many symptoms can be confused with other skin abnormalities. Diagnosis of the disease often comes between the ages of three and five when infant teeth begin to erupt, and the inflammation and degeneration of the tissues surrounding and supporting the teeth becomes apparent.

Treatment 
Treatment of HMS is similar to that for Papillon-Lefevre Syndrome.
 Oral retinoids, such as acitretin, etretinate, and isotretinoin, for the treatment of keratoderma and, less effectively, for periodontitis.  Topical emollients, salicylic acid and urea preparations can also be used as adjuncts.
 Extraction of the primary teeth combined with oral antibiotics and professional teeth cleaning, for periodontitis.

It has been reported that Inflammation associated with the arthritis caused by HMS can be controlled by removal of the synovial tissue surrounding affected joints (synovectomy), at the cost of permanent handicap.

See also 
 Ichthyosis–sclerosing cholangitis syndrome
 List of cutaneous conditions
 List of dental abnormalities associated with cutaneous conditions

References

External links 

Genodermatoses
Palmoplantar keratodermas
Syndromes affecting teeth
Syndromes affecting the skin
Rare syndromes